The Sardinia Free Zone Movement is a political party active in Sardinia, led by Maria Rosaria Randaccio.

History
The movement was founded in 2012 with the aim of establishing a free zone regime in the territory of the Autonomous Region of Sardinia. Its founders were the lawyers Maria Rosaria Randaccio, Paolo Aureli and Francesco Scifo.

In the 2014 regional election, the movement took part in the centre-right coalition in support of the candidacy of the outgoing president Ugo Cappellacci, obtaining 1.6% of the vote and one seat, won by Modesto Fenu. However, in 2015, the Council of State declared Fenu lapsed from the charge along with three other regional councilors.

In 2018, Paolo Aureli and Francesco Scifo, respectively outgoing vice president and secretary of the movement, announced their adhesion to the list "Free Sardinians", headed by Mauro Pili, on the occasion of the 2019 regional election.

In the same election, Randaccio, remained president of the movement, was a candidate among the ranks of Forza Italia in the constituency of Cagliari, but without being elected.

A few months later, Randaccio is still a candidate on the Forza Italia list in the municipal elections of Cagliari on June 16, in support of Paolo Truzzu's candidacy for mayor. However, even on this occasion she was not elected.

Electoral results

Sardinian regional elections

Leadership
President: Maria Rosaria Randaccio (2012–present)
Vice President: Paolo Aureli (2012–2018)
Secretary: Francesco Scifo (2012–2018)

References

External links
Website of Maria Rosaria Randaccio 
Old website of the Sardinia Free Zone Movement 

Political parties in Sardinia
Political parties established in 2012
2012 establishments in Italy